Henri Auguste Barbier (29 April 1805 – 13 February 1882) was a French dramatist and poet.

Barbier was born in Paris, France. He was inspired by the July Revolution and poured forth a series of eager, vigorous poems, denouncing the evils of the time. They are spoken of collectively as the Iambes (1831), though the designation is not strictly applicable to all. As the name suggests, they are modelled on the verse of André Chénier. They include La Curée, La Popularité, L'Idole, Paris, Dante, Quatre-vingt-treize and Varsovie.  The rest of Barbier's poems are forgotten, and when, in 1869, he received the long delayed honour of admission to the Académie française, Montalembert expressed the general sentiment with "Barbier? mais il est mort!," but actually he died at Nice in 1882.

Barbier  collaborated with Léon de Wailly in the libretto of Berlioz' opera Benvenuto Cellini, and his works include two series of poems on the political and social troubles of Italy and England, printed in later editions of Iambes et poèmes.

Works 
 La Curée (1830, dans la Revue de Paris).Texte sur wikisource 
 Les Mauvais Garçons (1830). With Alphonse Royer.
 Iambes et poèmes (1831) Texte sur Wikisource 
 II Pianto : poème (1833) Texte en ligne 
 Salon de 1836. Suite d'articles publiés par le Journal de Paris (1836)
 Lazare : poème (1833) 
 Satires et poèmes (1837)
 Nouvelles Satires : pot-de-vin et érostrate (1840)
 Chants civils et religieux (1841)
 Rimes héroïques (1843) 
 Rimes légères : chansons et odelettes (1851)
 Satires et cahants (1853)
 Silves : poésies diverses (1864)
 Satires (1865) Texte sur Wikisource
 Trois passions (1867)
 Discours de réception (1870).
 Histoires de voyage : souvenirs et tableaux, 1830-1872 (1880). Réédition : Slatkine, Genève, 1973.
 Contes du Soir (1879).
 Chez les poètes : études, traductions et imitations en vers (1882) Texte en ligne
 Les Quatre Heures de la toilette des dames : poème érotique en quatre chants (1883)
 Œuvres posthumes (4 volumes, 1883-1889) Texte en ligne
Translations
 William Shakespeare : Jules César : tragédie (1848)
 Samuel Taylor Coleridge : La Chanson du vieux marin (1877)
Libretto
 Benvenuto Cellini, opera in 2 acts, lyrics by Léon de Wailly and Auguste Barbier, music by Hector Berlioz'', Paris, premiered at the théâtre of the Académie royale de musique 3 September 1838. Texte en ligne
Popular Culture
His poem Le Gin is referenced in Season 2 of Les Témoins Texte en ligne
The murderer writes graffiti near crime scenes based on these lines of the poem:  
"Les mères mêmes, en rentrant pas à pas, 
Laissent tomber les enfants de leurs bras, 
Et les enfants, aux yeux des folles mères, 
Vont se briser la tête sur les pierres."

References

External links
 

1805 births
1882 deaths
Writers from Paris
19th-century French dramatists and playwrights
Members of the Académie Française
Burials at Père Lachaise Cemetery
19th-century French poets